is a nonprofit cooperative news agency based in Minato, Tokyo. It was established in November 1945 and it distributes news to almost all newspapers, and radio and television networks in Japan. The newspapers using its news have about 50 million subscribers. K. K. Kyodo News is Kyodo News' business arm, established in 1972. The subdivision Kyodo News International, founded in 1982, provides over 200 reports to international news media and is located in Rockefeller Center, New York City.

Their online news site is in Japanese, Chinese (Simplified and Traditional), Korean, and English.

The agency employs over 1,000 journalists and photographers, and maintains news exchange agreements with over 70 international media outlets.

Satoshi Ishikawa is the news agency's president.

Kyodo News was formed by Furuno Inosuke, the president of the Domei News Agency, following the dissolution of Domei after World War II.

Kyodo News is the only remaining news agency to transmit news via radiofax. It broadcasts complete newspapers in Japanese and English, often at 60 lines per minute instead of the more normal 120 because of the greater complexity of written Japanese.

A full day's news takes hours to transmit. Kyodo has a dedicated transmission to Pacific fishing fleets from Kagoshima Prefectural Fishery Radio, and a relay from 9VF, possibly still in the Netherlands. The frequencies formerly used by JJC radio outside Tokyo are now sent from an unknown location, using the same identification in Japanese as 9VF. They are still active and heard daily in 2017.

See also

References

External links 
Kyodo News
 Official news site (English)
 Official news site (traditional Chinese)
 Official news site (simplified Chinese)
 Official news site (Japanese)
 Official corporate site (English)
 Official corporate site (Japanese)

K. K. Kyodo News
 Official site (Japanese)
 Official site (traditional Chinese)
 Official site (simplified Chinese)
 Official site (Korean)

1945 establishments in Japan
Mass media companies based in Tokyo
Mass media companies established in 1945
Cooperatives in Japan
News agencies based in Japan